Kamakhyanagar is a town (NAC) and a subdivision in Dhenkanal district in the Indian state of Odisha. It is located 37 km north of Dhenkanal.

Demographics
As of 2011 India census, Kamakhyanagar had a population of 16,810. Males constitute 53% of the population and females 47%. Kamakhyanagar has an average literacy rate of 73%, higher than the national average of 59.5%. Male literacy in the city is 81%, and female literacy is 65%. In Kamakhyanagar, 11% of the population is under 6 years of age.

Politics
Current MLA from Kamakhyanagar Assembly Constituency is Sj. Prafulla Kumar Mallik of BJD, who won the seat in State elections of 2004. Previous MLAs from this seat were: Brahmananda Biswal of BJD in 2000, Kailash Chandra Mohapatra who won in 1995 as INC and as INC(I) candidate in 1980, and Prasanna Kumar Pattanayak who won as JD candidate in 1990 and as BJP candidate in 1985 and as JNP candidate in 1977 .

Kamakhyanagar is part of Dhenkanal (Lok Sabha constituency).

See also
 Dhenkanal District
 Dhenkanal
 Dhenkanal (princely state)

References

Cities and towns in Dhenkanal district